Weid may refer to:

Weid (Ulster), a river of Hesse and Thuringia, Germany, tributary of the Ulster
Weid, a district of the municipality Gretzenbach, canton Solothurn, Switzerland
WEID-LD, a television station in South Bend, Indiana, United States

People with that name
Henning Weid (born 1950), Norwegian Nordic combined skier

See also
Wied (disambiguation)